Look to the Lilies was a short-lived Broadway musical with a book by Leonard Spigelgass, lyrics by Sammy Cahn, and music by Jule Styne.

Based on both the 1962 novel and film versions of Lilies of the Field, it tells the story of a group of German nuns, headed by a determined, dauntless Mother Superior, who manage to get an African American itinerant handyman/jack-of-all-trades named Homer Smith to build a chapel for the New Mexico community in which they live, despite not having money to pay him.

Background
Styne composed his score with Ethel Merman in mind, but director Joshua Logan cast Shirley Booth instead. Sammy Davis, Jr.'s salary demands put him out of the running, and the role of Homer went to Al Freeman, Jr., whom Logan later described as "difficult" and "antagonistic."

Production
The musical premiered on Broadway on March 29, 1970 at the Lunt-Fontanne Theatre, where it ran for 25 performances and 31 previews. The musical was the last for Booth, over 70 years old at the time of the premiere, but she garnered unanimous critical raves from the critics. Raymond Bordner  wrote: "Miss Booth is simply marvelous all the way, and it is a real treat to see her again on Broadway". Richard Watts, in the New York Post, mentioned "Miss Booth's warm and gracious appeal." They also praised designer Jo Mielziner's use of desert tones, projections, scrims, and lighting to create the atmosphere and mood of the desert Southwest, but found little else of merit in the show.

Song list
Act I
 Gott is Gut
 First Class Number One Bum
 Himmlisher Vater
 Follow the Lamb
 Don't Talk About God
 When I Was Young
 Meet My Seester
 One Little Brick at a Time
 To Do a Little Good
 There Comes a Time
 Why Can't He See
 I'd Sure Like to Give It a Shot
Act II
 Them and They
 Does It Really Matter
 Look to the Lilies
 I Admire You Very Much Mr. Schmidt
 Some Kind of Man
 Chant
 Casamagordo, New Mexico
 Follow the Lamb (Reprise)
 One Little Brick at a Time (Reprise)
 I, Yes Me, That's Who

Notes

References
Not Since Carrie: Forty Years of Broadway Musical Flops by Ken Mandelbaum, published by St. Martin's Press (1991), pages 29–31

External links

Time Magazine review

1970 musicals
Broadway musicals
Musicals based on novels
Musicals based on films
Musicals by Jule Styne